Valts Eiduks (born 21 October 1986) is a Latvian cross-country skier. He competed in the men's sprint event at the 2006 Winter Olympics.

References

1986 births
Living people
Latvian male cross-country skiers
Olympic cross-country skiers of Latvia
Cross-country skiers at the 2006 Winter Olympics
People from Jēkabpils